Hemlata (born 16 August 1954) is an Indian classically trained playback singer in Bollywood. She is best known for her songs in the late 1970s, especially Ankhiyon Ke Jharokhon Se song.

She was nominated for Filmfare Best Female Playback Award five times in the period of 1977–81 and won once for Chitchor in 1977 for her classical rendition of "Tu Jo Mere Sur Mein" which was duet with K.J. Yesudas, composed by Ravindra Jain.

Early life and background
Hemlata was born in Hyderabad as Lata Bhatt into an Marwari Brahmin family and spent her childhood in Calcutta.

She was married to Yogesh Bali, the brother of Indian film actress Yogeeta Bali.

Career

Leading career

In association with Ravindra Jain, she had worked on many other songs. Among them is "Ankhiyon Ke Jharokhon Se". According to the Binaca Geet Mala (a radio show that used to compile records of album sales), it became the number one song in the year 1978. Hemlata was also nominated for Filmfare award for the best female playback singer for this song. It has received millions of views on YouTube. Hemlata sang on Jain's cassette album Sahaj Dhara (1991) dedicated to Shri Mataji Nirmala Devi, and sang songs from this album in two concerts in Brussels, Belgium in July 1992.

In the 1990s, Doordarshan had invited her to perform "Tista Nadi Si Tu Chanchala"

Performing career and albums
She has lent her voice for Ramanand Sagar's epics T.V. Serial Ramayan (She also appeared herself in one episode to perform traditional Meera Bhajan Payoji Maine Ram Ratan Dhan Payoji), as well as Uttar Ramayan (Luv Kush) and Shri Krishna throughout the series.

She also rendered the Italian song O Sole Mio in concert in Italy during Easter 1992.

Regarding these three albums, only Sarhadein was released by Tips. 

She was the only one Bollywood singer, who has been selected by the world community of Sikhs and the government of Punjab as well as the Holy Akal Takht to perform Gurmat Sangeet live composed in original Ragas for the celebration of 300 years of Sikh Khalsa Panth at Shri Anandpur Sahib Akal Takht on 13 April 1999. Kini Tera Ant Na Paya was the only one album of Sikh Sangeet which was especially in her voice and inaugurated by the honourable Chief Minister of Punjab Shri Prakash Singh Badal and attended and blessed by honourable Prime Minister of India Shri Atal Bihari Vajpayee.

In November 2010, she was in news for filing FIR against the mother in law of Sonali Bendre for cheating Hemlata in a case of selling a bungalow in Lokhandwala, for Rs.25 million.

Awards and nominations

|-
| rowspan="2"|1977
| "Tu Jo Mere Sur Mein" (Chitchor)
| rowspan="5"|Filmfare Award for Best Female Playback Singer
| 
|-
| "Sun Ke Teri Pukar" (Fakira)
| 
|-
| 1979
| "Ankhiyon Ke Jharokhon Se" (Ankhiyon Ke Jharokhon Se)
| 
|-
| 1980
| "Megha O Re Megha" (Sunayana)
| 
|-
| 1981
| "Tu Is Tarah Se Meri Zindagi Mein Shaamil Hai" (Aap To Aise Na The)
| 
|}

Filmography

2000s

1990s

1980s

1970s

1960s

References

External links

Living people
Bollywood playback singers
Indian women playback singers
1954 births
Singers from Hyderabad, India
Rajasthani people
Film musicians from Andhra Pradesh
Singers from Rajasthan
Women musicians from Rajasthan
20th-century Indian singers
20th-century Indian women singers
21st-century Indian women singers
21st-century Indian singers
Nepali-language singers from India
Filmfare Awards winners